The World Series of Pro Football was a name applied to two professional football events:

World Series of Football (1902), a multiple-game tournament held from 1902 to 1903
World Series of Pro Football (1950), the unofficial AAFC-NFL unified championship held in September 1950